Clarksville is a town in northern Coös County, New Hampshire, United States. The population was 294 at the 2020 census. It is part of the Berlin, NH–VT Micropolitan Statistical Area.

History 
The first census taken was in 1830; there were 88 residents.

Clarksville was incorporated in 1853, but known as "Dartmouth College Grant" until 1872. Clarksville derives its name from the Clark family, who cleared the land for settlement. The area was originally part of a tract granted to Dartmouth College; sections were sold off by the college to raise money. It was purchased by Benjamin Clark of Boston and Joseph Murdock of Norwich, Vermont.

In the late 19th century, major industries included starch and maple sugar. For many years the largest employers in town have been logging companies.

Geography 
Clarksville is bordered to the north and west by Pittsburg, and to the west by one mile of waterfront on the Connecticut River (across from the village of Beecher Falls, in the town of Canaan, Vermont). To the south are Stewartstown, Dixville and Dix's Grant. The east borders on Atkinson and Gilmanton Academy Grant. The 45th parallel north passes through the town.

New Hampshire Route 145 traverses the western end of the township, running south from Pittsburg village into Stewartstown. Prior to the construction of U.S. Route 3 along the Connecticut River, this was the only road north to Pittsburg.

Significant water bodies include portions of Lake Francis, Clarksville Pond, Carr Pond and Dead Water Stream. The western two-thirds of Clarksville lies within the Connecticut River watershed and the eastern third in the Androscoggin River watershed. Clarksville's town hall, elevation , is the highest town hall in the state. (The town hall of Washington is located at a lower elevation——but has other village development there, and is therefore the highest town center in the state.)

Demographics 

At the 2000 census (and again, informally, in 2004), there were 294 people, 118 households and 88 families living in the town. The population density was 4.9 per square mile (1.9/km). There were 307 housing units at an average density of 5.1 per square mile (2.0/km). The racial makeup of the town was 95.92% White (i.e., all but 12), none African American, 1.02% Native American, none Asian, none Pacific Islander, none from other races, and 3.06% from two or more races. Hispanic or Latino people of any race were 1.70% of the population.

There were 118 households, of which 30.5% had children under the age of 18 living with them, 66.9% were married couples living together, 2.5% had a female householder with no husband present, and 25.4% were non-families. 19.5% of all households were made up of individuals, and 5.9% had someone living alone who was 65 years of age or older. The average household size was 2.47 and the average family size was 2.80.

22.8% of the population were under the age of 18, 4.1% from 18 to 24, 23.5% from 25 to 44, 38.1% from 45 to 64, and 11.6% who were 65 years of age or older. The median age was 44 years. For every 100 females, there were 111.5 males. For every 100 females age 18 and over, there were 102.7 males.

The median household income was $40,179 and the median family income was $44,688. Males had a median income of $32,750 compared with $21,111 for females. The per capita income for the town was $18,090. About 5.4% of families and 3.7% of the population were below the poverty line, including none of those under the age of eighteen and 8.7% of those sixty-five or over.

See also 

New Hampshire Historical Marker No. 115: 45th Parallel

References

External links 
 New Hampshire Economic and Labor Market Information Bureau Profile

Towns in Coös County, New Hampshire
Berlin, New Hampshire micropolitan area
Towns in New Hampshire